Giovanni Antonio Stuardi (Poirino, Piedmont, 1862 -1938) was an Italian sculptor.

Biography

Born in Piemont, and active and resident in Turin. He was a pupil of Odoardo Tabacchi at the Accademia Albertina, and later of a sculptor Belli.

He completed many of the funereal monuments in the cemeteries of Turin and other Piedmont towns, including bas-reliefs and portraits, among them, the stucco bust of Lupercus, exhibited at Turin, in 1884; and the statue: Savoia, exhibited in Livorno, in 1886, and in Venice, in 1887, where he exhibited: Flower of the countryside.

In 1889, he displayed a statue of Charity at the Promotrice of Turin, which was acquired by the King. He also completed the Madonna delle Vette atop Monte Rocciamelone, which was cast in bronze. He also complete the Monument to Don Bosco a Castelnuovo Don Bosco.

References

1862 births
1938 deaths
Accademia Albertina alumni
20th-century Italian sculptors
20th-century Italian male artists
19th-century Italian sculptors
Italian male sculptors
People from Poirino
19th-century Italian male artists